Alexandr Ivanovich Maletin (born February 6, 1975) is a boxer from Russia best known to win the lightweight world championships 1997.

Career
Maletin won the bronze medal in the lightweight division (– 57 kg) at the 2000 Summer Olympics in Sydney, Australia. He beat Makhach Nuridinov (Azerbaijan) 14–5, Patrick Lopez (Venezuela) RSC 3 and Selim Palyani (Turkey) RSC 4.
In the semifinals, he was defeated by eventual gold medalist southpaw Mario Kindelán from Cuba 15–27.
In 2002, he became European champion by besting Boris Georgiev.

Light Welterweight
He beat Manus Boonjumnong 34:16 in 2003 but controversially lost the World championships final 2003 against French southpaw Willy Blain.
Maletin also represented his native country at the 2004 Summer Olympics in Athens, Greece, where he defeated Saleh Khoulef (Egypt) RSC 3 (0:10) and lost again to Willy Blain (France) 20–28.

Olympic results 
2000
Defeated Makhach Nuridinov (Azerbaijan) 14-5
Defeated Patrick Lopez (Venezuela) RSC 3
Defeated Selim Palyani (Turkey) RSC 4
Lost to Mario Kindelán (Cuba) 15-27

2004
Defeated Saleh Khoulef (Egypt) RSC 3 (0:10)
Lost to Willy Blain (France) 20-28

References
 databaseOlympics.com

1975 births
Living people
Lightweight boxers
Boxers at the 2000 Summer Olympics
Boxers at the 2004 Summer Olympics
Olympic boxers of Russia
Olympic bronze medalists for Russia
Olympic medalists in boxing
Russian male boxers
AIBA World Boxing Championships medalists
Medalists at the 2000 Summer Olympics